Daniel Keith (born October 19, 1982) is an American actor, screenwriter and playwright, director, producer, and musician. He is best known for his roles as Sheriff Gary O'Reilly in Love in Kilnerry and the lead singer of the rock band, Modakai. Keith has won 31 awards and 21 nominations for acting, writing, and directing. Keith has taught at the American Theater for Actors in New York City.

Early life and education 

Keith was born in a small ranching town in Bedford, Texas in 1982. His father, Dan, was a Marine and air traffic controller. His mother, Jacquelyn, worked in the mailroom at IBM. His parents amicably divorced when Keith was five. Bedford being in a small town, there wasn't much to do except play music and watch movies. He played in rock bands while at Trinity High School and played drums in the marching band. He attended the University of North Texas before touring the country with his band, Modakai. In 2006, the band moved to New York City. When the band went on hiatus in 2009, Keith had no backup plan in life. His best friend suggested he try acting and Keith enrolled at the Stella Adler Studio of Acting. In 2013 he enrolled in Circle in the Square Theatre School, followed by Atlantic Theater, Magnet Theater, and in 2021 enrolled in the Royal Academy of Dramatic Art. He also studied with Sybil Lines of the Royal Shakespeare Company and Jon Shear, an MFA Grad Professor at Columbia University.

Career

Music 

Modakai (originally called Belafonte) was formed in 2003 in Dallas, Texas, by Keith (lead vocals, guitar, keyboard), Joel Buchanan (drums), Daniel Rohrs (bass), and Joseph Otto (guitar, keyboard, vocals). The band's first EP, Any Place Is Better Than Here, was premiered on BBC Radio 1 by Jo Whiley in 2005. The band toured the US following their second and third singles "As Hard As You Like It" and "If You'll Stay". The band moved to New York City in 2006 headlining Arlene's Grocery, the Knitting Factory, and Mercury Lounge. They competed against bands from around the world and won second place in the Emergenza Battle of the Bands event in 2007. Modakai released their self titled album in 2009 (produced by Rip Rowan, James McWilliams, and engineered by Paul Williams). Before leaving for their UK tour, the band went on hiatus and didn't release another EP for eight years, Bedroom Recordings, featuring demo tracks, peel sessions, and raw recordings from their bedroom. In 2021, two tracks from their self titled album, "Everything" and "It Was You", appeared on the motion picture soundtrack for Love in Kilnerry released by Archway Pictures.

Film, TV, Stage 
Keith was cast in his first theater play in New York in 2013 in Mark Hooker's Miss Longview Texas Drag Pagent as the promiscuous cowboy, Willey. As an excuse to be on as many television and movie sets as possible, to learn as much as he could, Keith worked as a background actor and as a stand-in for Mark Ruffalo, Jim Parsons, and Joe Mantello in Normal Heart and for Justin Timberlake in Runner Runner and the first two seasons of Gotham for Cory Michael Smith. He shot his first short film, called Rambler, in 2013 that would win him several acting awards for playing a scarred up Cockney serial killer. He was cast in his first television appearance in Person of Interest on CBS as a bomb maker, named Isaac. He has also appeared in shows such as The Blacklist (NBC), Blindspot (NBC), and Marvel's Luke Cage (Netflix).

In 2017 he wrote, directed, produced, and starred in his directorial debut feature of Love in Kilnerry. The film went on to win 45 awards and 26 nominations before being distributed theatrically nationwide. In 2022, The Producers Guild of America granted Keith the Producers Mark (p.g.a.) to be used in the film for his extensive work producing the film. His company, Archway Pictures, teamed up with Mutiny Pictures to expand the theatrical release nationally.

Filmography

Television

Theatre credits

Awards and nominations

References

External links 

 
 Daniel Keith Official Site
  Daniel Keith at Rotten Tomatoes
  Daniel Keith at Instagram
  Archway Pictures at Official Site
  Modakai at Spotify

20th-century American male actors
21st-century American male actors
American male film actors
American male stage actors
American male Shakespearean actors
American male television actors
American people of Scottish descent
American people of Swedish descent
Stella Adler Studio of Acting alumni
Living people
Male actors from Texas
University of North Texas alumni
1982 births